Rodrigo Diamanti is a Venezuelan human rights activist and Director of the Human Rights NGO Un Mundo Sin Mordaza. He was detained during the 2014 Venezuelan protests,  as he was targeted by SEBIN agents as the creator of the global campaign SOS Venezuela. Upon release from detention, Diamanti fled from Venezuela and completed a Harvard MPA degree, later becoming an Ash Fellow with Harvard University.

References 

Venezuelan human rights activists
Venezuelan prisoners and detainees
Harvard Kennedy School alumni
Living people
Year of birth missing (living people)
Place of birth missing (living people)
Venezuelan expatriates in the United States